The 1999 CAF Cup was the height football club tournament season that took place for the runners-up of each African country's domestic league. It was won by ES Sahel in two-legged final victory against Wydad Casablanca.

First round

|}

Second round

|}

Quarter-finals

|}

Semi-finals

|}

Final

|}

Winners

External links
CAF Cup 1999 - rsssf.com

3
1999